The Human Condition is the seventh studio album by American hard rock band Black Stone Cherry. It was released on October 30, 2020 through Mascot Records, and was their sixth consecutive No. 1 debut on the UK Rock Albums chart. The album's lead single "Again" became their highest charting single on the Canada Rock Chart, as well as their first Top 20 hit on the Mainstream Rock Airplay Chart in the US since "Me and Mary Jane" in 2014. It is the last album to feature founding member and bassist Jon Lawhon, before his departure from the band on June 2, 2021.

On August 27th, 2021, the band released a digital deluxe edition of the album, featuring two covers of Tracy Chapman's "Give Me One Reason," as well as live versions of four of the album's original tracks. Their cover has since peaked at No. 25 on Billboard's Mainstream Rock Airplay chart.

Track listing

Charts

References

2020 albums
Black Stone Cherry albums
Mascot Records albums